Abhilasha is a 1983 Indian Telugu-language thriller film directed by A. Kodandarami Reddy and produced by K. S. Rama Rao.  The film stars Chiranjeevi and Raadhika while Rao Gopal Rao and Gollapudi Maruti Rao play vital roles and the music is composed by Ilaiyaraaja. An adaptation of Yandamuri Veerendranath's novel of the same name, it revolves around a young lawyer striving to end capital punishment in India, but gets himself entangled in a murder case.

The film released theatrically on 11 March 1983 to positive response and was commercial success. The film was remade in Tamil as Sattathai Thiruthungal (1984). In spite of being an adaptation of a novel, the core plot was observed to be similar to two American filmsThe Man Who Dared (1946) and Beyond A Reasonable Doubt (1956).

Plot 
Struggling lawyer Chiranjeevi (Chiranjeevi) lives with his roommate (Allu Aravind) and strives for removing Section 302 of the Indian Penal Code. The reason behind his determination is his father's death sentence under 302 for rape and murder, which he didn't commit.

Sarvothama Rao (Rao Gopal Rao), a famous criminal lawyer in that city, sends an invitation to every famous lawyer for a party at his place. By his secretary's mistake, one invitation reaches Chiranjeevi, and he gets a chance to meet Sarvothama Rao at his house. As Chiranjeevi reaches Sarvothama Rao's house he is first nervous & confused but firmly believes to express his idea about IPC 302 to Sarvothama Rao.

There at party Chiranjeevi is offered a drink & he sips it casually. He keeps drinking until he fills up. In the unconscious state he believes that he is explaining his proposal to everyone out there. Meanwhile, one among his colleagues ask him if he is ok & suddenly Chiranjeevi feels like vomiting & in an embarrassing situation he covers his mouth tightly with his hands & moves away from there.

He then goes in search of a restroom. While he is struck by the door of a room at Sarvothama Rao's house, he opens it & gets into it. Later in the restroom Chiranjeevi starts vomiting. Unfortunately the tap of the sink doesn't work & in order to get some water he tries to open another water valve but he wets himself under a shower. After bouts of vomiting he then feels relieved from a bad hangover & this is where he also accidentally meets Sarvothama Rao's niece Archana (Raadhika) at the party & when Archana enquiries about his whereabouts suspiciously, Chiranjeevi tells that he has unknowingly entered her room as he was nauseous & he apologises her for using her restroom with out her permission. Once Archana is clear with her doubts, they began to converse more and this is where Chiranjeevi falls in love with her. When their love starts blossoming, Archana has to attend a meeting in another country and she leaves for a few days.

During this time, Chiranjeevi comes up with an idea: to plan a fake murder in which he will implicate himself and receive a death sentence. According to his plan, Sarvothama Rao will show original pictures of the dead body to the governor at the last moment and rescue Chiranjeevi. Then, both intend to file a petition with the Supreme Court against IPC 302. They manage to frame him with the body of a woman, and Chiranjeevi is sentenced to death, just as he planned. In jail, guard Vishnu Sharma (Rallapalli) is surprised to see Chiranjeevi happy before his death. Archana returns from abroad and finds out that Chiranjeevi will be hanged the next day. She goes to meet Chiranjeevi in prison, and he acts like he actually did commit the crime out of lust. Archana does not know Chiranjeevi's plan and leaves in disgust. On the night before Chiranjeevi's hanging, Sarvothama Rao, who is on his way to meet governor to rescue Chiranjeevi, has an accident.

A tense Chiranjeevi reveals to Vishnu Sharma that this was all fake and that he did not kill the woman, pleading for his help. Vishnu Sharma runs to Archana's house to tell her the truth. After a night-long struggle, they manage to get in touch with Sarvothama Rao, who is alive in the hospital. They get the original negatives, and Chiranjeevi is saved from being hanged.

Sarvothama Rao throws a party to celebrate Chiranjeevi's success and announces Chiranjeevi and Archana's engagement. Obulesu (Gollapudi Maruti Rao), a drunk, drags Chiranjeevi out of the party, and Archana gets suspicious about their secret talk. She follows him. Meanwhile, Chiranjeevi believes that the dead body of the woman he used did not die a natural death. A postmortem report shows that she was killed by a man with 4 fingers on one hand. Archana remembers a goon who attacked her on the night she saved Chiranjeevi. Chiranjeevi reveals that he bought the body from that 4-fingered goon. It slowly unfolds that the dead woman was Sarvothama Rao's daughter from his extramarital relationship. Sarvothama Rao is arrested, and in court, the judge sentences him to death. But Chiranjeevi objects. He finds that the death penalty is ridiculous and that it is not a punishment to kill someone. To punish, one must suffer for his/her actions. After a short speech, the judge agrees and instead gives him 7 years to prison.

Cast 

Chiranjeevi as Chiranjeevi
Raadhika as Archana
Rao Gopal Rao as Sarvothama Rao
Rallapalli as Vishnu Sarma
Gollapudi Maruthi Rao as Obulesu
Rajyalakshmi as Sarvothama Rao's daughter
Bheema Raju as Bheema Raju
Mada Venkateswara Rao
Uyyuru Ramakrishna
C. S. Rao
Satyendra Kumar
P. J. Sarma
Vijayaram
Krishna Chaitanya
Tham
K. L. N. Rao
Mallikharjuna Rao
G. Murthy
M. Jagadeesh Babu

Production 
After the success of his horror novels in the late 1970s, Yandamuri Veerendranath came up with the novel Abhilasha. Being a fan of Yandamuri's novels, K.S. Rama Rao wanted to make his first film based on this novel.  Rama Rao until than had been dubbing Tamil films into Telugu and also distributing films and was involved in publicity for films as well.

Rama Rao approached Chiranjeevi to play the lead. Chiranjeevi accepted the film immediately as a few months ago his mother when reading the novel recommended him to make a film based on it with him as the lead. Tama Rao brought together the combination of actor Chiranjeevi, writer Yandamuri Veerendranath, composer Ilaiyaraaja and director A. Kodandarami Reddy together for the first time with this movie. This combination later went on to make many successful films in the 1980s.

Soundtrack 
All songs were composed by Ilaiyaraaja.

Reception 
Venkat Rao of Andhra Patrika, writing his review on 18 March 1983, praised the film for screenplay, direction and performances of the lead cast. "Chiranjeevi has breath life into his character, its not an exaggeration to say the he would reach greater heights in terms of acting," he opined. The reviewer also wrote "Introducing songs in the films of such genre may affect the screenplay, Illayaraja's soundtrack however would be appealing to the youth."

The film initially received negative feedback during its premier at Madras. Director Reddy and writer Yendamuri who were in Hyderabad that time, worried about their film career which was dependent on Abhilasha's success.

However, upon release, the film received a positive response from all areas and became a commercial success. Director Reddy opined that the film's success boosted the careers of the cast and crew.

References

Bibliography

External links 

1983 films
Films directed by A. Kodandarami Reddy
1980s Telugu-language films
Films scored by Ilaiyaraaja
Films based on Indian novels
Films based on novels by Yandamuri Veerendranath
1983 crime drama films
Indian courtroom films
Films about capital punishment
Fiction about murder
Indian crime drama films
Telugu films remade in other languages
Indian legal films